Twentynine Palms is a 2003 film directed by Bruno Dumont.

Plot 
With a Russian woman called Katia, a young American photographer called David drives a Hummer from Los Angeles to a motel in the little desert town of Twentynine Palms. As she hardly speaks English and he speaks no Russian, they talk in French, a language in which neither is confident. Much of their communication is therefore non-verbal and the two frequently misunderstand each other. 
Their days are spent driving and walking around the empty desert, sometimes naked. They make love, they fight, or just pass time. The camera contrasts the vastness, timelessness and emptiness of the landscape with the two small humans. Yet, as well as natural beauty, the desert contains menace. Stopped by a pick-up full of rednecks, David is beaten and raped while Katia is stripped and forced to watch. Back at the motel after their ordeal, David cuts off his hair before stabbing Katia to death. The police find the Hummer in the desert with his corpse beside it.

References

External links
 
 
  (in French)

2003 films
2000s erotic drama films
2000s French-language films
Films directed by Bruno Dumont
Films set in California
Films set in deserts
Twentynine Palms, California
Films about rape
French erotic drama films
2003 drama films
2000s French films